The Cayemites are a pair of islands located in the Gulf of Gonâve off the coast of southwest Haiti. The two islands, known individually as Grande Cayemite and Petite Cayemite, are a combined  in area. Petite Cayemite lies just west of the larger island, Grande Cayemite.

References 

Gulf of Gonâve
Islands of Haiti
Grand'Anse (department)